Topass (Topass, Topass Seaman or Topas) was a term used by the British Merchant Navy for the man who acted as an interpreter for a group or gang of Lascars or South Asian seamen on British vessels since at least the mid nineteenth century. Usually the topass came from the Luso-Asian communities, such as those from Goa and Bombay, and could speak English (and often Portuguese) to pass on instructions to a group of sailors and to report back or mediate between Lascars and the European crew. Topaze Indo-Portuguese was a term applied in India by the British East India Company in the eighteenth century to describe Luso-Asians - usually from the Portuguese territories in the Indian subcontinent, or formerly Portuguese territories such as Bombay. One of the first references to them is in the British Anti-piracy campaign of 1756 when 300 Topaze Indo-Portuguese on the British ships Kent, Kingfisher, and Tiger captured the fortress of Geriah on 14 February 1756.

References

Merchant navy